Robert "Bob" Rogers is an American writer of over 24 romance novels under the female pennames Lee Rogers, Jean Barrett, Jean Thomas, and Jeanie Thomas since 1979.

Biography
Robert "Bob" Rogers lives with his wife Laura near along the shore of Lake Michigan in Wisconsin, U.S. He published romance novels since 1979 under female pennames Lee Rogers, Jean Barrett, and Jean Thomas at different publishers: Harlequin-Silhouette, Kensington, Berkley and Dorchester.

Bibliography
Source:

As Lee Rogers
All These Splendid Sins (1979)

As Jean Barrett

Single novels
Fire Bird (1985)
Hot On Her Trail (1990)
Heat (1991)
A Ring of Gold (1992)
Held Hostage (1992)
White Wedding (1995)
Fugitive Father (1998)
My Lover's Secret (1999)
Not Without You (2011)

Crossing Series
Delaney's Crossing (1997)
Archer's Crossing (1999)
McAllister's Crossing (2001)

Hawke Family
The Hunt for Hawke's Daughter (2001)
Private Investigations (2002)
Official Escort (2002)
Cowboy PI (2003)
Sudden Recall (2004)

Who is this Woman of Mystery? Multiauthor series
9. The Shelter of Her Arms (1994)

Mail Order Brides Multiauthor series
Man of the Midnight Sun (1996)

Top Secret Babies Multiauthor series
3. The Hunt for Hawke's Daughter (2001)
12. Paternity Unknown (2005)

Eclipse Multiauthor series
The Legacy of Croft Castle (2004)
To the Rescue (2006)

Dead Bolt Multiauthor series
Sudden Recall (2004)

Omnibus in collaboration
Stolen Bride / Sudden Recall (2004) (with Jacqueline Diamond)
Legacy of Croft Castle / Hijacked Honeymoon (2005) (with Susan Kearney)
Police Business / Paternity Unknown (2005) (with Julie Miller)

As Jean Thomas
AWOL with the Operative (2012)

References and sources

American romantic fiction writers
Year of birth missing (living people)
Place of birth missing (living people)
Living people
20th-century American novelists
21st-century American novelists
American male novelists
20th-century American male writers
21st-century American male writers
20th-century pseudonymous writers
21st-century pseudonymous writers